Anna-Lena Sörenson (born 1954) is a Swedish politician. She served as member of the Riksdag from 4 October 2010 to 24 September 2018, representing the constituency of Östergötland County.

She was the head of the Sweden-Kurdistan Parliamentary Network and visited Turkey in 2015 within a delegation of other Swedish politicians and attempted to convince Turkey and the Kurdistan Workers' Party (PKK) to return to the peace process which broke down. 

After serving in parliament, she led the Swedish Gambling Market Commission to investigate regulations and measures for online gambling advertising.

References 

Living people
1954 births
Place of birth missing (living people)
21st-century Swedish politicians
21st-century Swedish women politicians
Members of the Riksdag 2010–2014
Members of the Riksdag 2014–2018
Members of the Riksdag from the Social Democrats
Women members of the Riksdag